A gemstone is a piece of mineral crystal or rock used to make jewelry or other adornments.

Gemstone or gemstones may also refer to:

 Gemstone (database), or GemStone/S, commercial software by GemStone Systems 
 GemStone IV, GemStone III and GemStone II, multiplayer online role-playing video games
 Gemstone Publishing, an American company
 Gemstones (album) by Adam Green, 2005
 Gemstones (rapper) (Demarco Lamonte Castle, born 1981)
 Operation Gemstone, a planned series of clandestine acts leading to the Watergate burglary

See also

Gem (disambiguation)
Gems (disambiguation)